The Poetry Society of America's New York Chapbook Fellowship is awarded once a year to two New York poets under 30 years of age who have yet to publish a first book of poems. Two renowned poets select and introduce a winning manuscript for publication. Each winner receives an additional $1000 prize.

Winners 
2009:
 The Sundering by Stephanie Adams-Santos, selected by Linda Gregg
 Lure by Jocelyn Casey-Whiteman, selected by Arthur Sze

2008:
 Ave, Materia by Jean Hartig, selected by Fanny Howe
 The Category of Outcast by CJ Evans, selected by Terrance Hayes

2007:
 Monster Theory by Lytton Smith, selected by Kevin Young
 The Original Instructions for the Perfect Preservation of Birds &c. by Carey McHugh, selected by Rae Armantrout

2006:
 Locket, Master by Maya Pindyck, selected by Paul Muldoon
 On animate life: its profligacy, organ meats, etc. by Jessica Fjeld, selected by Lyn Hejinian

2005
 Cold Work by Cecily Parks, selected by Li-Young Lee
 The Next Country by Idra Novey, selected by Carolyn Forche

2004
 Gilda by Andrea Baker, selected by Claudia Rankine
 Speaking Past the Tongue by Justin Goldberg, selected by Henri Cole

2003
 Forget Rita by Paul Killebrew, selected by John Ashbery
 The Misremembered World by Tess Taylor, selected by Eavan Boland

See also 
 Poetry Society of America
 List of American literary awards
 List of poetry awards

External links 
  Poetry Society of America chapbook fellowships page

American poetry awards